3-hydroxydecanoyl-(acyl-carrier-protein) dehydratase (D-3-hydroxydecanoyl-[acyl-carrier protein] dehydratase, 3-hydroxydecanoyl-acyl carrier protein dehydrase, 3-hydroxydecanoyl-acyl carrier protein dehydratase, β-hydroxydecanoyl thioester dehydrase, β-hydroxydecanoate dehydrase, beta-hydroxydecanoyl thiol ester dehydrase, FabA, β-hydroxyacyl-acyl carrier protein dehydratase, HDDase, β-hydroxyacyl-ACP dehydrase, (3R)-3-hydroxydecanoyl-[acyl-carrier-protein] hydro-lyase) is an enzyme with systematic name (3R)-3-hydroxydecanoyl-(acyl-carrier protein) hydro-lyase. This enzyme catalyses the following chemical reaction

 (1) a (3R)-3-hydroxydecanoyl-[acyl-carrier protein]  a trans-dec-2-enoyl-[acyl-carrier protein] + H2O
 (2) a (3R)-3-hydroxydecanoyl-[acyl-carrier protein]  a cis-dec-3-enoyl-[acyl-carrier protein] + H2O

This enzyme is specific for C10 chain length.

References

External links 
 

EC 4.2.1